Stratton Park Halt served the community of Stratton St Margaret, now part of the Borough of Swindon in Wiltshire, England. The station was on the main Great Western Railway line from London to Bristol and opened around 1840. The Beeching cuts brought its closure in 1964, by which time it was only served by five trains per day.

References 

 

Disused railway stations in Wiltshire
Former Great Western Railway stations
Railway stations in Great Britain opened in 1840
Railway stations in Great Britain closed in 1964
Beeching closures in England